Masters Champions League (MCL) was a Twenty20 cricket league held in the United Arab Emirates and contested by former international cricketers. It consisted of six teams and the only season of the competition which took place was held in January and February 2016 and won by the Gemini Arabians. The MCL received approval for a 10 seasons from the Emirates Cricket Board but faced difficulties before its first season over the status of "retired" international players who were still contracted to other domestic competitions and folded after just one season. Problems were experienced by the league with delays in player payments which almost led to players abandoning the tournament mid-season.

2016 Masters Champions League was the Twenty20 cricket tournament that took place from 28 January to 13 February 2016 in Dubai and Sharjah in the United Arab Emirates. The tournament was contested by six teams of fifteen players, all former international cricketers, with the Gemini Arabians defeating the Leo Lions in the final by 16 runs.

History
The tournament was announced by the league's CEO Zafar Shah in June 2015. The league generated some support in the United Arab Emirates, including the official approval from the Emirates Cricket Board. The company operated under the umbrella of the Grand Midwest Group.

MCL governing body
The MCL governing body included the Chief Operating Officer, Sean Morris (COO), President Abdul Rahman Falaknaz and six others including former international cricketers Allan Border and Graham Gooch and businessman Zafar Shah.

Player auction

Former South Africa all-rounder Jacques Kallis achieved the top bid of the player auction, joining the Libra Legends for US$175,000. Former Australia wicketkeeper-batsman Adam Gilchrist was the second-highest signing, purchased by the Sagittarius Strikers for $170,000. Other players with high bids included former England captain Paul Collingwood ($140,000), Muttiah Muralitharan of Sri Lanka ($120,000), West Indies' Brian Lara ($100,000) and Brett Lee of Australia ($100,000).

Teams
The following six franchises participated in the tournament:

Venues

Standings

 
  Top four teams advanced to the semi finals

Knockout phase

Semi finals
The top four teams from the group stage qualified for the semi finals.

Final
The winners of the two semi-finals qualified for the final:

Statistics

Most runs

Most wickets

References

 
Cricket in the United Arab Emirates
Professional sports leagues in the United Arab Emirates
Cricket leagues in the United Arab Emirates
Sports leagues established in 2016
Organisations based in Dubai
2016 establishments in the United Arab Emirates
Recurring sporting events established in 2016
Recurring sporting events disestablished in 2016
Defunct cricket leagues
Domestic cricket competitions in 2015–16
2016 in Emirati cricket